Haplochrois chlorometalla is a moth in the family Elachistidae. It was described by Edward Meyrick in 1897. It is found in Australia, where it has been recorded from New South Wales.

References

Natural History Museum Lepidoptera generic names catalog

Moths described in 1897
Elachistidae
Moths of Australia